Germann is a surname. Notable people with the surname include:

Francis Joseph "Frank" Germann (b. 31 August 1922, d. 30 April 2012) accomplished athlete, coach and volunteer at Athol Murray College of Notre Dame
Greg Germann (born 1958), American actor
Hannes Germann (born 1956), Swiss politician, current member of the Swiss Council of States for the Canton of Schaffhausen
Markus Germann (born 1942), Swiss figure skater
Monika Germann (born 1954), Swiss cross country skier who competed in the early 1980s
Pierre Germann (born 1985), French footballer
Theodor Germann (1879–1935), Latvian chess master

References

German-language surnames